The 1986 New Mexico Lobos football team was an American football team that represented the University of New Mexico in the Western Athletic Conference (WAC) during the 1986 NCAA Division I-A football season.  In their fourth and final season under head coach Joe Lee Dunn, the Lobos compiled a 4–8 record (2–5 against WAC opponents) and were outscored by a total of 338 to 317. 

The team's statistical leaders included Ned James with 1,777 passing yards, Kevin Burgess with 1,023 rushing yards and 72 points scored, and Terance Mathis with 955 receiving yards. 

The first three road games were televised live in the Albuquerque market over KGSW 14 (now KLUZ-TV), while all of their home games were seen on same-night delay.

Schedule

References

New Mexico
New Mexico Lobos football seasons
New Mexico Lobos football